Teynampet, also Teynampettai, is one of the busiest commercial localities in the city of Chennai, Tamil Nadu, India. Part of the city's central business district, it is surrounded by Gopalapuram in the north, Mylapore in the east, Alwarpet in the south, Nandanam in the south-west and T.Nagar in the west. The Teynampet Signal is one of the most important road junctions in Chennai and witnesses some of the worst traffic during peak hours in the city. Teynampet is home to some of the most expensive real estate and properties in Chennai. The Teynampet section of Anna Salai hosts some of the most important Government offices and luxury hotels in the city.

Etymology
Teynampet is along Anna Salai, the arterial road of Chennai. Teynampet derives its name from Thennam and pettai (Place of coconut trees) due to the coconut groves that once existed there.

Geography
As of 2018, Teynampet zone had a green cover of more than 20 percent, as against the city's 14.9 percent average.

Notable landmarks
Poes Garden houses two of the most celebrated houses in Chennai; residences of former chief minister of Tamil Nadu J. Jayalalithaa and Actor Rajinikanth. Gopalapuram area houses the residence of former chief minister of Tamil Nadu M. Karunanidhi. Teynampet also houses Anna Arivalayam, which is the headquarters of the DMK party, also PMK party headquarters at Vannia Teynampet and upscale hotels such as Hyatt Regency and Marriott Courtyard. The famous Diocesan Church and the Gemini Flyover are also in this region.

Education

Teynampet houses two of Chennai's well known women's colleges, Justice Basheer Ahmed Sayeed College (more commonly known as SIET) and Stella Maris College. The schools in and around Teynampet include SIET Boys and Girls School, DAV Girls and D.A.V Boys School in Gopalapuram, Sri Sarada Matriculation School in Gopalapuram, National Public School (N.P.S) in Gopalapuram and Church Park Convent.

Economy 
Teynampet is a fastest growing retail hub. Prestige Polygon is home to Microsoft Corporation.

Gallery

References

Neighbourhoods in Chennai
Cities and towns in Chennai district